Trailer Bride is the self-titled debut album by the alternative country band Trailer Bride, released in 1997.

Critical reception
No Depression praised the album, writing that it "shows off some spiffy guitar and harmonica playing, and some ear-catching vocals, and some deceptively simple, almost loopy lyrics that hide pretty powerful insights."

Track listing
All songs written by Melissa Swingle.
 "Sorry Times" - 3:11
 "Mardi Gras" - 3:32
 "Let Mama Drive" - 3:32
 "Rouge" - 2:53
 "Arrowheads" - 4:20
 "Road to Canaan" - 3:14
 "Trailer Bride" - 3:43
 "Maudlin" - 3:07
 "Landyacht Take Me Home" - 2:35
 "Chatham Co. Militia" -  2:57
 "Sway" - 2:57
 "Flying Saucer" - 2:55
 "Train at Night" - 4:17

Personnel
 Brad Goolsby - drums
 Melissa Swingle - vocals, guitars (acoustic, electric, & slide), harmonica, organ, saw
 Robert Mitchener - bass

Additional personnel

 Mike Beard - Jew's-Harp, tambourine
 Bryon Settle - guitar, shaker
 Joanne Ramsey - background vocals

References

Trailer Bride albums
Yep Roc Records albums
1997 debut albums